DNN was a rolling news service on Digital Radio in the United Kingdom.

Background
It was revolutionary for the British radio market as it was the first regional network of rolling news stations. Set up in 2001, the network of five stations was available in the Manchester and the North West, Newcastle and the North East, Cardiff and Wales/West, Birmingham and the West Midlands and from 2003 in Leeds and Yorkshire.

Sue Owen was the stations launch director, with Dave Richards as her Deputy Editor. Richards took on her role upon her departure for BBC Radio Stoke just six months after the stations launched. This followed a culling of staff through redundancy.

The stations ran on a 20-minute menu of news, sport, travel, business and showbiz. It was a truly dip in service for news junkies, hence the strap: The News you Want, When you Want it! DNN also acted as a news bulletin provider to around 30 stations across the UK offering regional news, sport and travel. It was thought it would go on to be a regional rival to IRN.

DNN was set up by Capital (GCap Media), Chrysalis Radio and GMG as part of the bid to win regional DAB licenses from the Radio Authority, who later became Ofcom. Regulations have always demanded news and local content on new stations and DNN was seen as the carrot to win the new multiplex licenses.

DNN's target audience was male and female, 35 to 55 and ABC1. 

After 5 years of operation and little investment DNN was absorbed into LBC at the end of 2006 by the then sole owner Chrysalis. and LBC's London talk station was heard on the MXR regional multiplexes. A reduced digital news bulletin service was moved out of DNN's Heart Birmingham home and into Chrysalis London, which subsequently became Global Radio.

However, in December 2008, the DAB regional news bulletins and travel reports ceased. LBC and Heart Digital are now a straight relay of the news bulletins and output of the London FM stations, and The Arrow is now a non-stop, DJ-free music station,

Station Sound
DNN's station sound was developed by QSonic and an example of the jingle package is available on sound cloud. 

https://soundcloud.com/drewfoolery/digital-news-network-dnn

Presenters
 Bill Steel
 Anita Clements
 John Collins
 Dave Richards 
 Gareth Setter
 Amy Armstrong 
 James Rea
 Sue Owen 
 Caroline Beavon
 Dave McMullan
 Carl Edwards (ITV News)
 Lisa Dowd (Sky News)
 Chris Blakemore (BBC WM)

See also
 Sky News Radio

References 

News and talk radio stations in the United Kingdom
Defunct radio stations in the United Kingdom
Former British radio networks
Radio stations established in 2001